Rhoda Kadalie  (22 September 1953 – 16 April 2022) was a South African academic. She was the founder of the Gender Equity Unit at  University of Western Cape (UWC). In June 1999 she   received an honorary doctorate from the Faculty of Social Sciences of Uppsala University, Sweden. She was the granddaughter of trade unionist Clements Kadalie.

Kadalie died of lung cancer on 16 April 2022, at the age of 68 in Los Angeles, California.

References

1953 births
2022 deaths
Deaths from lung cancer in California
University of the Western Cape alumni
Academic staff of the University of the Western Cape
People from Cape Town